Evciler District is a district of Afyonkarahisar Province of Turkey. Its seat is the town Evciler. Its area is 252 km2, and its population is 7,183 (2021). The district is near Lake Acıgöl and Işıklı reservoir. The average altitude is 981 m.

Composition
There is one municipality in Evciler District:
 Evciler

There are 7 villages in Evciler District:

 Akyarma
 Altınova
 Baraklı
 Bostancı
 Gökçek
 Körkuyu
 Madenler

References

External links
 District governor's official website 

Districts of Afyonkarahisar Province